P.M. Place Stores, also known as Place's Discount Stores was a Bethany, Missouri-based, employee-owned chain of discount stores in the United States.  The company primarily operated in towns with a population of 1,500 to 4,000 people in Illinois, Iowa, Kansas, and Missouri.

Origins
P.M. Place Stores was founded in 1910 by Pryor M. Place in Lathrop, Missouri.  Place financed his company by selling his horse, saddle, and bridle, and collected his savings to buy goods to stock his shelves.

Store format 
Place's stores carried the same departments as larger discount stores except on a smaller scale. Their prominent slogan was "The Best of All... Places" which could be heard on a recording that would repeatedly play in their stores amongst music and announcement of the latest sale items.

Expansion
In 1985 the company expanded through the acquisition of Matco/Mattingly stores, a Lexington, Missouri based chain of discount stores.

Place's attempted to grow to 75 stores by the end of 2002 but was bought by ShopKo in 2000 for $22 million with a store count of 49.  ShopKo converted these stores into Pamida stores.

At the time of assimilation into Pamida, Place's president and CEO was Charles M. Place.  Charles Patterson "Pat" Place had previously been in charge of the company.

In an effort to streamline Pamida's distribution operations, the Bethany cross-dock facility, formerly the Place's warehouse, was closed in early 2002.

See also

References

Defunct discount stores of the United States
Defunct companies based in Missouri
Companies based in Missouri
American companies established in 1910
Retail companies established in 1910
Retail companies disestablished in 2000
1910 establishments in Missouri
2000 disestablishments in Missouri